is a 1987 Japanese drama film  directed by Rentarō Mikuni. The film won the Jury Prize at the 1987 Cannes Film Festival.

Cast

References

External links 
 

1987 films
1980s Japanese-language films
1980s biographical drama films
Films directed by Rentaro Mikuni
Films about Buddhism
Biographical films about religious leaders
Japanese biographical drama films
Shochiku films
1987 drama films
1980s Japanese films